Małgorzata Książkiewicz (born 5 May 1967) is a Polish sport shooter. She won a bronze medal in 50 metre rifle three positions at the 1992 Summer Olympics in Barcelona. Książkiewicz was born in Zielona Góra.

References

1967 births
Living people
People from Zielona Góra
Polish female sport shooters
Olympic shooters of Poland
Olympic bronze medalists for Poland
Shooters at the 1992 Summer Olympics
Shooters at the 1996 Summer Olympics
Sportspeople from Lubusz Voivodeship
20th-century Polish women